The Stiftskirche is a church located in Tübingen, Baden-Württemberg, Germany. It is a late Gothic structure built by Peter von Koblenz in 1470. The stained glass windows were designed by Peter Hemmel of Andlau who also designed windows in Ulm, Augsburg, Nuremberg, Munich and Strasbourg. It is the central landmark of Tübingen and, along with the rest of the city, the Stiftskirche was one of the first to convert to Martin Luther's Protestant church. It maintains (and carefully defends) several "Roman Catholic" features, such as patron saints.

Tower music is played from the church tower every Sunday.

Burials in the Stiftskirche
Eberhard I, Duke of Württemberg
Ulrich, Duke of Württemberg
Duchess Sabina of Bavaria
Christoph, Duke of Württemberg
Duchess Anna Maria of Brandenburg-Ansbach
Ludwig III, Duke of Württemberg
Duchess Dorothea Ursula of Baden-Durlach
Duchess Ursula zu Veldenz-Lauterecken

Notes

References

Buildings and structures completed in 1470
15th-century churches in Germany
Tubingen George's Collegiate Church
Tubingen Stiftskirche
Tubingen
Buildings and structures in Tübingen
Tourist attractions in Tübingen
Burial sites of the House of Württemberg